Aye Maung Han is a Burmese paediatrician and professor, currently working as a senior consultant physician for two private hospitals in Yangon (Pun Hlaing and Shwegondaing Hospitals). He previously served as the rector (dean) of the University of Medicine-1, Yangon from 2007 to 2009. He has published over 25 scientific papers in medical journals. He graduated from the Institute of Medicine, Rangoon with a medical degree in 1973.

References

Burmese paediatricians
Living people
University of Medicine 1, Yangon alumni
Year of birth missing (living people)